Philip Newton, M.D. was an American who served with the Russian ambulance corps during World War I and was promoted to a General by Nicholas II.

Biography
He attended the United States Military Academy at West Point, New York.

While in Russia in 1915 he married Helene Shahofskaya.

References

United States Military Academy alumni
20th-century American physicians
Imperial Russian Army generals